Wheaton Arts and Cultural Center (formerly Wheaton Village) is a 501(c)(3)non-profit arts education organization, with a focus on the medium of glass.  Located in Millville, New Jersey, the center's mission is to engage artists and audiences in an evolving exploration of creativity.

In addition to daily glass blowing and craft demonstrations, WheatonArts features special exhibitions, programs, workshops, performances, and several weekend festivals throughout the year. WheatonArts hosts the Festival of Fine Craft yearly on the first full weekend in October. The organization was founded by Wheaton Glass, which was previously a major glass producer in Millville.

Museum of American Glass
The Museum of American Glass at WheatonArts houses over 7,000 pieces of glass, including a collection of glass produced by Wheaton Industries and other New Jersey glass-making companies.  Exhibits include paperweights, pressed glass, cut glass, early glass, bottles, 19th-century art glass, Art Nouveau glass, modern and contemporary studio glass.

Artist Studios

Artist Residencies: WheatonArts offers 3-week and 6-week long Creative Glass Fellowships, available April through December. 

The center houses several working studios for the creation of contemporary art in different media, including glass, ceramics, wood carving, and flameworking.  Daily demonstrations are given in each studio.

Down Jersey Folklife Center
The Down Jersey Folklife Center is a regional folklife center focusing on the cultural and artistic traditions of the communities and ethnicgroups of southern New Jersey. The center offers exhibitions and concerts, dance performances, and classes. It is open during special events and for educational programs only.

See also 
 Wistarburgh Glass Works

References

External links
Official Website
New Glass at Wheaton  Documentary produced by NJTV

Arts centers in New Jersey
Glass museums and galleries in the United States
Arts organizations based in New Jersey
Art museums and galleries in New Jersey
Museums in Cumberland County, New Jersey
Millville, New Jersey
Glassmaking schools